Poroshino is a rural locality (a selo) and the administrative center of Poroshenskoye Rural Settlement of Kytmanovsky District, Altai Krai, Russia. The population was 454 as of 2016. There are 6 streets.

Geography 
Poroshino is located 42 km southwest of Kytmanovo (the district's administrative centre) by road. Cherkasovo is the nearest rural locality.

References 

Rural localities in Kytmanovsky District